This is a list of events in British radio during 1967.

Events

January
No events

February
No events

March
Disc jockey John Ravenscroft returns to the UK from California, joins the offshore 'pirate radio' station Wonderful Radio London and adopts the name John Peel.

April
No events

May
John Peel's after-midnight show on pirate station Radio London becomes The Perfumed Garden and, contrary to the station's daytime "Fab 40" playlist, he introduces his eclectic mix of folk, blues, psychedelic and progressive rock which continues until the station is forced off the air in August and Peel moves to BBC Radio 1.

June
No events

July
No events

August
14 August – The Marine Broadcasting Offences Act is passed, making it an offence to advertise or supply an offshore radio station from the UK. This results in the closure of all of Britain's offshore pirate radio stations with the exception of Radio Caroline, which moves its supply operation to the Netherlands.

September
17 September – First broadcast of The World This Weekend on the BBC Home Service.
30 September – BBC Radio completely restructures its national programming: the Light Programme is split between new national pop station Radio 1 (modelled on the successful pirate station Radio London) and middle of the road Radio 2; the cultural Third Programme is rebranded as Radio 3; and the primarily-talk Home Service becomes Radio 4. Radio 1 is launched at 7:00 am with Tony Blackburn's Daily Disc Delivery show (theme tune: Johnny Dankworth's "Beefeaters") and the first track played is The Move's "Flowers in the Rain".

October
1 October – The first Peel Session for BBC Radio 1 takes place, featuring psychedelic rock band Tomorrow.

November
8 November – BBC Local Radio starts. The first station is BBC Radio Leicester.

December
22 December – Panel game Just a Minute is first aired on Radio 4 with Nicholas Parsons as chairman (initially as a temporary stand-in); Parsons continues to chair the show until shortly before his death in 2020.

Unknown
University Radio York obtains a testing and development licence as "Radio Heslington"; it becomes the United Kingdom's second student radio station, and also the country's first independent radio station.

Station debuts
30 September –
BBC Radio 1
BBC Radio 2
BBC Radio 3
BBC Radio 4
8 November – BBC Radio Leicester
15 November – BBC Radio Sheffield
22 November – BBC Radio Merseyside
Unknown – University Radio York

Closing this year
14 August – Wonderful Radio London (1964–1967)Radio 270 (1966 - 67)
30 September – 
Home Service (1939-1967)
Light Programme (1945-1967)
Third Programme (1946-1967)

Programme debuts
 May – The Perfumed Garden on Radio London (1967)
 1 October – The Official Chart on BBC Radio 2 (1967–Present)
 22 December – Just a Minute on BBC Radio 4 (1967–Present)

Changes of network affiliation

Continuing radio programmes

1940s
 Sunday Half Hour (1940–2018)
 Desert Island Discs (1942–Present)
 Family Favourites (1945–1980)
 Down Your Way (1946–1992)
 Letter from America (1946–2004)
 Woman's Hour (1946–Present)
 Twenty Questions (1947–1976)
 Any Questions? (1948–Present)
 The Dales (1948–1969)
 Billy Cotton Band Show (1949–1968)
 A Book at Bedtime (1949–Present)

1950s
 The Archers (1950–Present)
 Listen with Mother (1950–1982)
 From Our Own Correspondent (1955–Present)
 Pick of the Pops (1955–Present)
 The Clitheroe Kid (1957–1972)
 My Word! (1957–1988)
 Test Match Special (1957–Present)
 The Today Programme (1957–Present)
 The Navy Lark (1959–1977)
 Sing Something Simple (1959–2001)
 Your Hundred Best Tunes (1959–2007)

1960s
 Farming Today (1960–Present)
 In Touch (1961–Present)
 The Men from the Ministry (1962–1977)
 I'm Sorry, I'll Read That Again (1964–1973)
 Petticoat Line (1965–1979)
 Round the Horne (1965–1968)
 The World at One (1965–Present)

Ending this year
10 January – Have A Go (1946–1967)
August – The Perfumed Garden (1967)
September – Easy Beat (1960–1967)
29 September – Housewives' Choice (1946–1967)
29 September – Music While You Work (1940–1967)

Births
7 January – Mark Lamarr, comedian and radio and television presenter
2 February – Tushar Makwana, radio presenter (died 2004)
25 February – Jonathan Freedland, journalist
1 March – Jackie Brambles, English television and radio presenter
25 April – Tim Davie, Director-General of the BBC
27 November – Rosie Cavaliero, Brazilian-born actress
Unknown – Jamie Owen, Welsh radio and television presenter

Deaths
1 June – Derek McCulloch, children's radio presenter (born 1897)
December – Douglas Ritchie, radio news editor and wartime propaganda broadcaster (born 1905)

See also 
 1967 in British music
 1967 in British television
 1967 in the United Kingdom
 List of British films of 1967

References

Radio
British Radio, 1967 In
Years in British radio